Nocardioides antarcticus is a gram-positive, aerobic, rod-shaped and non-motile bacterium from the genus Nocardioides that has been isolated from marine sediments from Ardley Cove near King George Island in Antarctica.

References

External links 

Type strain of Nocardioides antarcticus at BacDive -  the Bacterial Diversity Metadatabase

antarcticus
Bacteria described in 2015